Saint Andrew Press, established in 1954 to promote the works of the theologian William Barclay, is the publishing house of the Church of Scotland. It merged with Scottish Christian Press in 2005.
In January 2011, Saint Andrew  Press's sales, production, marketing and distribution operations were outsourced by the Church of Scotland to Hymns Ancient and Modern.

References

1954 establishments in Scotland
Christian publishing companies
Church of Scotland
Book publishing companies of Scotland
Publishing companies established in 1954
British companies established in 1954